Sabahudin Kovačevič (born February 26, 1986) is a Slovenian professional ice hockey player currently under contract to the Graz 99ers of the Austrian Hockey League (EBEL). He participated in several IIHF World Championships as a member of the Slovenia men's national ice hockey team.

His older brother Senad (born 1981) is also a former ice hockey player.

Career statistics

Regular season and playoffs

International

References

External links

1986 births
Living people
HK Acroni Jesenice players
Graz 99ers players
HK Poprad players
Ice hockey players at the 2014 Winter Olympics
Ice hockey players at the 2018 Winter Olympics
Olympic ice hockey players of Slovenia
Sportspeople from Jesenice, Jesenice
Slovenian ice hockey defencemen
Slovenian expatriate sportspeople in Slovakia
Slovenian expatriate sportspeople in Kazakhstan
Slovenian expatriate sportspeople in Italy
Slovenian expatriate sportspeople in Denmark
Slovenian expatriate sportspeople in Russia
Slovenian expatriate sportspeople in Austria
Slovenian expatriate sportspeople in the Czech Republic
Slovenian expatriate sportspeople in Belarus
Expatriate ice hockey players in Slovakia
Expatriate ice hockey players in Kazakhstan
Expatriate ice hockey players in Italy
Expatriate ice hockey players in Denmark
Expatriate ice hockey players in Russia
Expatriate ice hockey players in Austria
Expatriate ice hockey players in the Czech Republic
Expatriate ice hockey players in Belarus
Slovenian expatriate ice hockey people